Jeff Hickman is a video game designer, producer and customer support specialist currently working as the executive producer of live services for BioWare. His main task is to oversee the live services and operations of Star Wars: The Old Republic. Hickman entered the gaming business in 2001 working for Mythic Entertainment as their director of customer support for the MMORPG Dark Age of Camelot. In 2005, he was promoted to executive producer, for DAOC.  In 2006, he became the executive producer of Warhammer Online: Age of Reckoning. In January 2011 Hickman was named executive producer of live services for Bioware.

Of his collaboration with Paul Barnett, Hickman has said:

"Paul and I work hand in hand. Paul is the crazy vision guy, I'm the guy that says that's great, but how are we going to do it? He and I work really well together. What you see shows really how we work together. He throws everything against the wall, and we say... how about this? Then he helps to make sure that what happens really works for the game."

During a trip to EA Mythic by members of Blue Öyster Cult, the visiting members co-wrote and recorded a song with members of the Warhammer team, including Jeff Hickman.

Notes

External links
Interview with Jeff Hickman at tentonhammer.com
Interview with Jeff Hickman and Paul Barnett at WarCry

Living people
Video game designers
Video game developers
Electronic Arts employees
BioWare people
Year of birth missing (living people)